Pauk may refer to:

People 
 Alex Pauk (born 1945), Canadian conductor and composer
 Goran Pauk (born 1962), Croatian politician
 György Pauk (born 1936), Hungarian violinist
 Ke Pauk (1934–2002), Cambodian communist
 Paul Pauk (1912–1941), American football player
 Walter Pauk (died 2019), American professor and author

Places 
Pauk, Myanmar, town in Pauk Township, Pakokku District, Magway Division, in northwest Burma (Myanmar)
Pauk Township, township of Pakokku District in Magway Division of Burma (Myanmar)
Pauk Airport (IATA: PAU, ICAO: VYPK), located in Burma near Pauk

Other uses 
Pauk class corvette, the NATO reporting name for a class of small patrol corvettes built for the Soviet Navy between 1977 and 1989

See also
 Kyar Pauk, Burmese musician
 Maung Pauk Kyaing, Burmese legendary king
 Mogok Pauk Pauk (born 1977), Burmese fashion designer